Thomas Rippon (1760–1835) was the Chief Cashier of the Bank of England from 1829 to 1835. Rippon was replaced as Chief Cashier by Matthew Marshall.

References

Chief Cashiers of the Bank of England
1760 births
1835 deaths